The plançon à picot, or simply plançon (also spelled planson), was a medieval infantry weapon designed for smashing and thrusting. It consisted of a stout iron-shod baseball-bat-like shaft (length 1–1.5 m) with a steel spike attached on top. It was cheap and easy to make plus it was extremely efficient against heavily armoured opponents. The weapon was a relative of the goedendag, a popular weapon of Flemish militias of the 14th century. Given that the plançon à picot was recorded at several times as being carried alongside the goedendag, they may not be identical.

Notes 

Medieval polearms